Kinect Fun Labs is an application development hub that allows users to play, create and share their own Kinect experiences. As of July 2012, there were fifteen games in the Fun Labs range.

Released games

External links
Kinect Fun Labs at Xbox.com

2011 video games
Kinect games
Kinect
Video games developed in the United States
Xbox 360 software
Xbox 360 games
Xbox 360-only games